Perthes Airfield is an abandoned World War II military airfield, which is located near the commune of Perthes in  the Champagne-Ardenne department of northern France.

Located probably north of the commune, it was a United States Army Air Force temporary airfield established during the Northern France Campaign in September 1944.  Its primary use was for P-47 Thunderbolt fighters of the Ninth Air Force 371st Fighter Group.

History
Known as Advanced Landing Ground "A-65", the airfield consisted of a single 5000' grass runway aligned 10/28. In addition, with tents were used for billeting and also for support facilities; an access road was built to the existing road infrastructure; a dump for supplies, ammunition, and gasoline drums, along with a drinkable water and minimal electrical grid for communications and station lighting.

Combat units stationed at the airfield were the 371st Fighter Group, between 18 September-1 October 1944 which flew support missions during the Allied invasion of Normandy, patrolling roads in front of the beachhead; strafing German military vehicles and dropping bombs on gun emplacements, anti-aircraft artillery and concentrations of German troops when spotted.

After the Americans moved east with the advancing Allied Armies, the airfield was closed on 5 October 1944, and the land was returned to its owners.  Today there is little or no physical evidence of its existence or its location.

See also

 Advanced Landing Ground

References

External links

World War II airfields in France
Airfields of the United States Army Air Forces in France
Airports established in 1944